St. Peters is a civil parish in County Roscommon, with a small number of townlands in County Westmeath, Ireland. It is located in the east of Roscommon..

St. Peters lies in the barony of Athlone.

The townlands in St Peters are: Banks, Bellanamullia, Bellaugh, Bogganfin, Bunnaribba, Canal and Banks, Cartron, Cloonakille, Cloonown, Doovoge, Killnamanagh, Long Island, Long Island (Little), Monksland, Rooskagh, Athlone and Bigmeadow, Ranelagh. 

The neighbouring civil parishes are: St. Mary's to the east, and Drum to the north, south and west.

References 

Civil parishes of County Roscommon
Civil parishes of County Westmeath